Sandeep Joshi may refer to:

Sandeep Joshi (Assam cricketer) - former Assam cricketer
Sandeep Joshi (Haryana cricketer) - former Haryana cricketer